Chen Zhaoyuan (1 October 1930 – 25 June 2020) was a Chinese engineer specializing in civil structural engineering and protection engineering. He was a member of the Chinese Civil Engineering Society (CCES).

Biography
Chen was born in Ningbo, Zhejiang, on 1 October 1930. In 1949 he was accepted by Shanghai Institute of Textile Technology (now Donghua University), where he majored in textile. He was admitted by Tsinghua University in 1950 and taught there when he graduated. He joined the Communist Party of China in March 1953. In August 1957, he obtained a master's degree in civil engineering from Harbin Institute of Technology. He was a visiting scholar at the University of Illinois at Urbana–Champaign between April 1983 and April 1984. He was appointed director of the Department of Architecture in September 1984, serving until September 1988. He died of illness in Beijing, on 25 June 2020.

Autobiography

Honours and awards
 1997 Member of the Chinese Academy of Engineering (CAE)

References

1930 births
2020 deaths
Scientists from Ningbo
Engineers from Zhejiang
Tsinghua University alumni
Donghua University alumni
Harbin Institute of Technology alumni
Members of the Chinese Academy of Engineering
Chinese structural engineers
20th-century Chinese engineers
Chinese autobiographers
21st-century Chinese writers
20th-century Chinese male writers
Male biographers
21st-century male writers
Chinese expatriates in the United States